X, a reference to the letter Chi in the Greek alphabet, is the name of a Greek album by singer Anna Vissi released 2002 in Greece and Cyprus by Sony Music Greece. The album reached 3× platinum in Greece and 3× platinum in Cyprus. It was also released in Turkey by Sony Music Turkey.

In 2019, the album was selected for inclusion in the Panik Gold box set The Legendary Recordings 1982-2019. The release came after Panik's acquisition rights of Vissi's back catalogue from her previous record company Sony Music Greece. This box set was printed on a limited edition of 500 copies containing CD releases of all of her albums from 1982 to 2019 plus unreleased material.

Track listing
 "Tasis Aftoktonias" (Suicidal tendencies)
 "X"
 "Se Zilevo" (I'm jealous of you)
 "Martirio" (Duet with Yiannis Parios) (Martyrdom)
 "Sinharitiria" (Congratulations)
 "Pai Teliose" (It's over)
 "Tifli Empistosini" (Blind trust)
 "Ta Radiofona" (The radios)
 "Ekplixi" (Surprise)
 "Aipnies" (Insomnia)
 "Pes To Xana" (Say it again)
 "Hronia Polla" (Happy birthday)

Music
Music and Lyrics are by Nikos Karvelas on all of the tracks except lyrics on track 4 (Natalia Germanou).

Music videos
 "Tasis Aftoktonias"
 "Pes To Ksana"

Singles
"Taseis Aftoktonias"
It was the lead single of her album X.
"Sinharitiria"
The second single of the album.
"Martirio" feat Yiannis Parios
The third single of the album.
"Pes To Xana"
It was the fourth single and second video of the album X.
"Tifli Empistosini (Remix)"
Taken from the EP "The Remixes"
"Se Zilevo (Remix)"
Another remix from "The Remixes" EP.

Charts

References

Anna Vissi albums
2002 albums
Greek-language albums
Sony Music Greece albums
Albums produced by Nikos Karvelas